Christian Rolando Lara Anangonó, nicknamed Diablito (Little Devil) (born April 27, 1980 in Quito), is an Ecuadorian footballer.

Club career
He spent most of his career with C.D. El Nacional football team in Ecuador. After a spell in Al-Wakrah SC in the Qatari League, he returned to his homeland from the Middle East to play for Liga Deportiva Universitaria de Quito (LDU) and went on to win the Ecuadorian Championship. He was then transferred to another Ecuadorian team in the city of Guayaquil Barcelona SC. In the year 2007 he received the award of being the best player playing in Ecuador's league.

On January 2, he signed for Colombian team Deportivo Pereira. On June 17, 2009 Lara was signed again with Liga Deportiva Universitaria de Quito.

International career
He is a midfielder. He made his Ecuador national team debut in 2001. Looked on for a long time as one of Ecuador's most promising players, he scored and made an assist against Argentina in the CONMEBOL 2006 FIFA World Cup qualification (CONMEBOL) to lead Ecuador to a 2-0 win over the South American giants. He was in the team's squad for the 2006 FIFA World Cup, Ecuador's second appearance in the finals. At 162 cm, he was considered the shortest player to play in the Germany 06 edition. In his last current played with Ecuador game against El Salvador, he scored the first goal in a 5-1 home win in Quito.

Career statistics

Club

Honors
El Nacional
Serie A: 2005 Clausura
LDU Quito
Serie A: 2007, 2010
Copa Sudamericana: 2009
Recopa Sudamericana: 2009, 2010

References

External links
 Lara's FEF Player Card
 video.google.com
 

1980 births
Living people
Footballers from Quito
Association football midfielders
Ecuadorian footballers
Ecuador international footballers
2002 CONCACAF Gold Cup players
2006 FIFA World Cup players
C.D. El Nacional footballers
Al-Wakrah SC players
L.D.U. Quito footballers
Barcelona S.C. footballers
Deportivo Pereira footballers
Real Cartagena footballers
Manta F.C. footballers
S.D. Quito footballers
Dorados de Sinaloa footballers
C.D. Clan Juvenil footballers
Ecuadorian expatriate footballers
Expatriate footballers in Colombia
Ecuadorian Serie A players
Qatar Stars League players
Categoría Primera A players